Atte Lindqvist (26 October 1894 – 26 June 1972) was a Finnish diver. He competed in the men's 3 metre springboard event at the 1924 Summer Olympics.

References

External links
 

1894 births
1972 deaths
Finnish male divers
Olympic divers of Finland
Divers at the 1924 Summer Olympics
Sportspeople from Vyborg